The flag of the Kirghiz SSR was adopted by the Presidium of the Supreme Council of the Kirghiz SSR decreed by its Decree on 22 December 1952. The 1978 constitution of the Kirghiz SSR states that the ratio of the flag is 1:2 with the blue/white/blue stripes in the middle taking  of the flag height and the white stripes  of flag height. The red, blue and white colors were derived from the Pan-Slavic colours.

According to the constitution in detail in article 168:

The flag differences from the flag of the Soviet Union and the flags of the Soviet Republics was a larger star (in comparison with the image of the sickle and hammer) and the location of the hammer and sickle practically on the border of the red and blue stripes: on the flags of all other republics (except for Georgia and Turkmenia), the diameter of the circle into which the 5-terminal star was inscribed was exactly half the size of the side of the square in which the sickle and hammer were inscribed, and on the flag of Kirghizia, the diameter of the star (1/10 of the width of the flag) was more than half Side of the square (1/6 of the width of the flag).

History
After the formation of the Kirghiz SSR on 5 December 1936 the first flag of the Kirghiz SSR was adopted.

The first variant of the flag used the Latin version of the Kyrgyz alphabet. This flag was in use from 1937 to 1940.

After the adoption of the Cyrillic alphabet new flag design was created.

On 22 December 1952, the red flag was replaced with a new red flag with a blue and white stripes in the middle of the entire length of the flag.

After independence, this flag remained the flag of the newly independent Kyrgyzstan until 1992 when a new flag was introduced.

Colours

See also
 Flag of the Soviet Union
 Coat of arms of the Kirghiz Soviet Socialist Republic
 Flag of Kyrgyzstan

References

Kirghiz Soviet Socialist Republic
Kirghiz Soviet Socialist Republic
National symbols of Kyrgyzstan
Flags of Kyrgyzstan

de:Flagge Kirgisistans#Geschichte